Cole Swindell is the debut studio album by the American country music artist of the same name. It was released on February 18, 2014 via Warner Bros. Records. The album includes the number one single "Chillin' It".

Background
Lead single "Chillin' It" was produced by Jody Stevens, who is the son of songwriter and producer Jeff Stevens, and formerly one-half of the duo Fast Ryde. Stevens also performed all instruments on that track. Luke Bryan's guitarist Michael Carter produced the rest of the album.

Critical reception

The eponymously titled Cole Swindell album received generally positive reception from music critics. At USA Today, Brian Mansfield rated the album two-and-a-half stars out of four, saying that the album contains an "unhurried confidence." Stephen Thomas Erlewine of AllMusic rated the album three stars out of five, writing that the release "goes down easy even if it sometimes seems like an overblown demo tape", which "winds up pleasant enough." At Newsday, Glenn Gamboa graded the album a B, stating that the album set him up for "country stardom." Matt Bjorke of Roughstock rated the album four out of five stars, saying that the release is "easily likeable" because he has an "easy-going charm" about himself. At Digital Journal, Markos Papadatos rated the album a perfect five stars, affirming that "The songs on here are polished and infectious." Kimberly Owens of Got Country Online rated the album a perfect five stars, stating that "Cole Swindell is pure talent, whether it be with his songwriting, or his vocals."

In 2017, Billboard contributor Chuck Dauphin placed four tracks from the album on his top 10 list of Swindell's best songs: "Ain't Worth the Whiskey" at number two, "Hope You Get Lonely Tonight" at number three, "Let Me See Ya Girl" at number five and "Chillin' It" at number six.

Commercial performance
Cole Swindell debuted at number three on the US Billboard 200 chart with 63,000 copies sold in its first week. With 42,000 of its sales were digital downloads, putting it at number one in the Top Digital Albums chart.  On March 13, 2016, the album was certified platinum by the Recording Industry Association of America (RIAA) for combined sales and album-equivalent units of over a million units. As of November 2016, the album has sold 510,400 copies in the United States.

Track listing

Personnel
Pat Buchanan – electric guitar, slide guitar
Michael Carter – electric guitar, piano, background vocals
Howard Duck – Hammond B-3 organ, piano, synthesizer
Josh Matheny – lap steel guitar
Shane Minor – background vocals
James Mitchell – electric guitar
Greg Morrow – drums, loop programming 
John Palmieri – background vocals
Billy Panda – acoustic guitar
Jody Stevens – banjo, bass guitar, acoustic guitar, electric guitar, keyboards, loop programming, drum programming, slide guitar, synthesizer
Cole Swindell – lead vocals
Russell Terrell – background vocals
Mike Wolofsky – bass guitar

Charts

Weekly charts

Year-end charts

Singles

Certifications

References

2014 debut albums
Cole Swindell albums
Warner Records albums